Somebody Help Me 2 is a 2010 horror film starring Marques Houston and Omarion, and is written and directed by their music producer, Chris Stokes. As the sequel, it follows up the events of Somebody Help Me, which was released in 2007. The film also stars Chris Stokes' daughter Chrissy Stokes.

Plot 
Brendan and Darryl have both moved on with their lives and have found new relationships following the events at the cabin in the woods; not unscathed however. Coming up on the anniversary, Brendan is still having nightmares that he feels will come true at any moment. His worst fears come to life when his wife Michelle (Azur-De) and niece Tee Tee (Chrissy Stokes) don't return home from work one night. Jasmine (Darryl's girlfriend) comes to Brendan's house to tell him Darryl is missing too.

Cast 
Marques Houston as Brendan Young
Omarion as Darryl Jennings
Malika Haqq as Jasmine
Azur-De as Michelle
Chrissy Stokes as Tee Tee
Sonny King as Corbin
Chris Stokes as OG
Irene Stokes as Nurse
Milo Stokes as John
Heather Raelynn Bryson as Samantha
Sebastian "Sebass" Wolski as Bria

Release
The film was released on DVD and Blu-ray on August 16, 2011.

References

External links
 Somebody Help Me 2 at The Internet Movie Database

American horror films